This is an incomplete list of seasons competed by the Ottawa Rough Riders, a Canadian Football League team.  While the team was founded in 1876, they did not join the CFL until it was founded in 1958. The franchise folded in 1996 due to poor management and would not see another team until the Ottawa Renegades franchise. Throughout their history, the Rough Riders have won nine Grey Cups.

Ontario sport-related lists
Redblacks